Gibraltar is a self-governing British Overseas Territory, located to the north of the Strait of Gibraltar on the Iberian Peninsula.

Gibraltar may also refer to:

Places

Europe 
Strait of Gibraltar, at the western end of the Mediterranean Sea
Bay of Gibraltar, the area of sea to the West of the Gibraltar Strait
Campo de Gibraltar, a Spanish comarca and former municipal term and hinterland of the town of Gibraltar
Gibraltar, Bedfordshire, a location in England
Gibraltar, Buckinghamshire, England
Gibraltar, Kent, a location in England
Gibraltar, Oxfordshire, a location in England
 Gibraltar-Ost and Gibraltar-West, quarters of Luzern, Switzerland
Gibraltar Mill, Great Bardfield, a windmill now converted to residential use
Gibraltar Point, Lincolnshire National Nature Reserve, in Lincolnshire, England
La Línea de Gibraltar, the original name of La Línea de la Concepción in Spain
Monemvasia, a Greek peninsula and fortress, has been called the Gibraltar of the East
Petrovaradin Fortress, Petrovaradin, Novi Sad, Serbia, nicknamed "Gibraltar on/of the Danube"
Rock of Gibraltar, a monolithic rock formation on the European side of the strait

The Americas 
 Gibraltar, Michigan, a city, USA
 Gibraltar, North Carolina, a ghost town, USA
 Gibraltar, Nova Scotia, a community, Canada
 Gibraltar, Pennsylvania, an unincorporated community, USA
 Gibraltar, Venezuela
 Gibraltar, Washington, an unincorporated community, USA
 Gibraltar, Wisconsin, a town, USA
 Gibraltar Building, in Newark, New Jersey, USA
 Gibraltar Dam in California, USA
 Gibraltar Island in Ohio, USA
 Gibraltar Mountain (Alberta), a peak in the Canadian Rockies in Alberta, Canada
 Gibraltar Rock State Natural Area, in Wisconsin, USA
 Gibraltar Area Schools, in Wisconsin, USA
 Gibraltar School District, in Michigan, USA
 Gibraltar District School No. 2, in Wisconsin, USA
 Gibraltar Secondary School, in Wisconsin, USA
 Gibraltar (Wilmington, Delaware), a historic building, in Wilmington, Delaware, USA 
 "Gibraltar of the West", poetic name for the Imperial fortress colony of Bermuda
 "Gibraltar of the South", an alias for Fort Fisher, USA
 "Gibraltar of the West Indies", and alias for Brimstone Hill Fortress in Saint Kitts and Nevis

Australia 
 Gibraltar Creek, Australian Capital Territory, Australia 
 Gibraltar Hill, New South Wales, Australia
 Gibraltar Peak, Australian Capital Territory, Australia 
 Gibraltar Range National Park, New South Wales, Australia
 Gibraltar Rock (Western Australia), Western Australia, Australia

Far East 
 Gibraltar of the East, Winston Churchill's sobriquet for Singapore Naval Base

Film 
 Gibraltar (1938 film), a French drama film directed by Fedor Ozep
 Gibraltar (1964 film), a French thriller film directed by Pierre Gaspard-Huit
 Gibraltar (2011 film), a Rwandan documentary film
 The Informant (2013 film), a French crime thriller film with the original title Gibraltar
 The Living Daylights, a James Bond film, has its opening sequence within Gibraltar
 Rocky Gibraltar, a character from the Toy Story film series

History 
 Battle of Gibraltar (disambiguation), several historic events
 Gibraltar of South America, an appellation for the Fortress of Humaitá on the River Paraguay
 , the name of seven ships of the Royal Navy
 Kingdom of Gibraltar, one of the historic substantive titles pertaining to the Spanish monarchy
 Marquisate of Gibraltar, a short-lived Castilian nobility title
 Operation Gibraltar, a Pakistan plan to infiltrate Jammu and Kashmir in 1965

Music 
 Gibraltar, a song by Joe Zawinul from Black Market, 1976
 Gibraltar, a song by Freddie Hubbard from Freddie Hubbard/Stanley Turrentine in Concert Volume One, 1973 and from Born to Be Blue, 1982
 Gibraltar, a song by Beirut from No, No, No, 2015
 Gibraltar, a 2006 recording from French rapper Abd al Malik (rapper)
 Gibraltar Hardware, drum hardware manufacturer

Religion 
 The Diocese of Gibraltar in Europe (Anglican)
 The Roman Catholic Diocese of Gibraltar

Science 
 Gibraltar candytuft (Iberis gibraltarica), a plant endemic to Gibraltar

Other uses 
 Gibraltar espresso, an espresso drink developed in the US closely related to a Cortado
 Gibraltar rock (candy), hard candy associated with Salem, Massachusetts
 Black Gibraltar, another name for the German/Italian wine grape Trollinger
 Gibraltar (or Gibraltar Life), a brand used by Prudential Financial in several countries
 Gibraltar Point Lighthouse and Gibraltar Point Blockhouse, Toronto, Canada
 45608 Gibraltar, a British LMS Jubilee Class locomotive
 , the former Confederate States Navy ship CSS Sumter
 Gibraltar, a playable character in the game Apex Legends
 Gibraltar (Wilmington, Delaware), country estate home of Hugh Rodney Sharp